The Cedar Grove School #81 is a historic school building on the west side of Arkansas Highway 115 in the small community of Brockett, Arkansas, about  north of Pocahontas.  It is a wood frame one-room schoolhouse,  in size, with a gable roof and a concrete foundation.  It was built in 1938, replacing another building destroyed by a tornado, and served as a district school until 1948, when the district was consolidated into the Pocahontas schools.  The building has been used since then by the Brockett Home Extension Club as a community center.

The building was listed on the National Register of Historic Places in 2004.

See also
National Register of Historic Places listings in Randolph County, Arkansas

References

School buildings on the National Register of Historic Places in Arkansas
One-room schoolhouses in Arkansas
Neoclassical architecture in Arkansas
School buildings completed in 1938
Buildings and structures in Randolph County, Arkansas
National Register of Historic Places in Randolph County, Arkansas